John Stradling was Archdeacon of Llandaff from 1447 to 1454.

References

Archdeacons of Llandaff